The 2016–17 Bangladesh Cricket League was the fifth edition of the Bangladesh Cricket League, a first-class cricket competition. It was held in Bangladesh from 28 January to 8 March 2017. The tournament was played after the conclusion of the other first-class competition in Bangladesh, the 2016–17 National Cricket League. Central Zone were the defending champions. North Zone won the tournament, securing their first title in the competition.

Points table

Fixtures

Round 1

Round 2

Round 3

Round 4

Round 5

Round 6

References

External links
 Series home at ESPN Cricinfo

2016-17
Bangladesh Cricket League
2017 in Bangladeshi cricket
Bangladeshi cricket seasons from 2000–01